The 1997 Damallsvenskan was the tenth season of the Damallsvenskan. Matches were played between 19 April and 25 October  1997. Älvsjö AIK won the title for the third consecutive year, by six points from Malmö FF. Bälinge IF finished third. 

Before the season, Djurgården, Lotorps IF and Östers IF were promoted. At the end of the season, the last two teams, as well as Jitex BK, were relegated.

Table

Damallsvenskan seasons
1997 in association football
1997 in Swedish sport